Eion Katchay (born 8 December 1977) is a Guyanese-born cricketer who has played four One Day Internationals and four Twenty20 Internationals for Canada. He played for Guyana's under-19 team. His first ODI Matches debut had July 1, 2008, Canada vs Bermuda at King City. His first debut at T20 Matches was on August 2, 2008, Netherlands vs Canada at Belfast.

References

1977 births
Living people
Canada One Day International cricketers
Canada Twenty20 International cricketers
Canadian cricketers
Guyanese cricketers
Guyanese emigrants to Canada
Guyana cricketers